HIP 57050 (GJ 1148 / LHS 2443 / G 122-40 / Ross 1003) is a red dwarf 36 light-years from the Sun with a planetary companion HIP 57050 b.

HIP 57050 has a metallicity twice that of the Sun and is among the highest in the immediate solar neighborhood.

Planetary system
A team led by astronomer Nader Haghighipour reported the discovery of a Saturn-sized planet in the habitable zone of the star in 2010. According to Haghighipour, the detection is important because it "indicates that observational techniques are on the right track for finding habitable low-mass rocky planets similar to Earth."

According to its discoverers, HIP 57050 b provides support for the proposition that planet-bearing M-class stars tend to be metal-rich, a correlation already observed in F, G and K-class stars.

At the expected planetary effective temperature, the atmosphere may contain water clouds, potentially detectable by the Hubble Space Telescope if it could capture a planetary transit.

The planet's discoverers speculated about the possibility of a habitable moon:
"By analogy with our own solar system, whose gas giants all have dozens of moons, one might expect HIP 57050 b to also harbor such moons. In our solar system, ~0.02% of the masses of the gas giants are assigned to their satellites. This would translate to a satellite with ~2% of Earth's mass (similar to Titan) orbiting HIP 57050 b. While it is not out of the question that HIP 57050 b could harbor a moon, and that moon would thus be in the liquid water HZ of the parent star, an object with only 1/5th of the mass of Mars in the liquid water HZ is probably not a particularly good prospect for habitability from various standpoints. In any case, direct detection of such a moon would be extremely challenging."

Paul Gilster of the Tau Zero Foundation has commented:
"Based on our knowledge of the gas giants in our own Solar System, it's a natural supposition that this is a world with moons, and if so, their location in the habitable zone draws inevitable comparisons with fictional worlds like Pandora."

Gilster suggested that an Earth-sized moon could exist around the planet if it were captured after forming independently.

A second planet was suspected based on additional radial velocity measurements made at W. M. Keck Observatory, this was confirmed by measurements taken at Calar Alto Observatory.

References

M-type main-sequence stars
Ursa Major (constellation)
1148
057050
Emission-line stars
J11414471+4245072
Planetary systems with two confirmed planets